Such Great Foolishness (German: Die ganz großen Torheiten) is a 1937 German drama film directed by Carl Froelich and starring Paula Wessely, Rudolf Forster and Hilde Wagener. The film was set in Vienna, unusually for a German film of the time which had increasingly cut back on films set in Austria since the Nazi takeover of 1933. The film was based on a novel by Marianne von Angern.

It was shot at the Sievering Studios in Vienna and the Tempelhof Studios in Berlin.

Cast

References

External links

Films of Nazi Germany
German drama films
1937 drama films
Films directed by Carl Froelich
Films based on Austrian novels
Films set in Vienna
Wiener Film
Films shot at Sievering Studios
Films shot at Tempelhof Studios
Tobis Film films
Films scored by Ralph Benatzky
German black-and-white films
1930s German films
1930s German-language films